Mixtape is a collection of tracks merged by Leeds-based grindie band Hadouken! to create a mixtape. The tracks include Hadouken! remixes of other songs, and a demo version of the band's debut single, "That Boy That Girl". The mixtape was released as a free digital download following the band's previous single, "Liquid Lives".

Track listing

 Bloc Party - "The Prayer" (Hadouken! Remix)
 Like Woah! - "Oh I Like (Woah!)"
 David E Sugar feat. Ears - "First OK"
 Wiley - "Eskiboy"
 Plan B - "No More Eatin'" (Hadouken! Remix)
 Virus Syndicate - "Red Eyes"
 TNT - "Transmission"
 Skepta feat. Wiley, JME & Creed - "Duppy"
 Klaxons - "Atlantis to Interzone" (Hadouken! Remix)
 Bolt Action Five - "Tree Friend Tree Foe" (Kissy Sell Out Remix)
 Hadouken! - "Tuning In" (H! Re-Dub)
 Uffie - "Ready to Uff"
 Kate Nash - "Caroline Is a Victim"
 Mr. Oizo - "Flat Beat"
 Klaxons - "Golden Skans" (David E Sugar Remix)
 Justice - "Phantom"
 Fox N Wolf - "Youth Alcoholic"
 Radioclit - "Mature Macho Machine" (Solid Groove and Sinden Remix)
 The Gossip - "Standing in the Way of Control" (Soulwax Remix)
 Test Icicles - "Catch It"
 Jixilix? - "Go"
 Hadouken! - "That Boy That Girl" (Demo)

References

2007 mixtape albums
Hadouken! albums